The men's shot put at the 2018 IAAF World Indoor Championships took place on 3 March 2018.

Summary
Thomas Walsh came in as the defending champion.  Five throws into the competition, he threw  to improve upon his own Oceanian record set while winning the previous championships.  Nobody would beat that mark in the competition, except Walsh himself, first equalling it in the third round then throwing  as the final attempt of the day.  Indoor marks now being acceptable, that mark moved him to the number 15# performer in the shot put of all time, displacing Ryan Whiting who was in the competition.

The race for the other medals was much more competitive.  On their first attempts, Whiting threw 20.96m, Darrell Hill threw 21.06m, David Storl threw 21.14m and Darlan Romani threw 21.23m.  Romani and Storl held those positions until the fourth round when, Tomáš Staněk threw 21.44m to move into silver position.  Two throws later, Storl matched that mark exactly.  With a superior 2nd (and 3rd) best throw, Storl held the tiebreaker.  In the final round, Romani couldn't get back on the podium with his 21.37m, a new South American indoor record, then Storl improved on his tie breaking position again.

Results
The final was started at 11:57.

References

Shot put
Shot put at the World Athletics Indoor Championships
2018 in men's athletics